Abdoulaye Cissé may refer to:
 Abdoulaye Cissé (footballer, born 1983), Ivorian-born Burkinabé footballer
 Abdoulaye Cissé (footballer, born 1996), Guinean footballer